The Queensboro Bridge, officially named the Ed Koch Queensboro Bridge, is a cantilever bridge over the East River in New York City. Completed in 1909, it connects the neighborhood of Long Island City in the borough of Queens with the Upper East Side in Manhattan, passing over Roosevelt Island. The bridge is also known as the 59th Street Bridge because its Manhattan end is located between 59th and 60th streets.

The Queensboro Bridge carries New York State Route 25 (NY 25), which terminates at the bridge's western end in Manhattan, and also once carried NY 24 and NY 25A. The western leg of the Queensboro Bridge is flanked on its northern side by the freestanding Roosevelt Island Tramway.  The bridge was, for a long time, simply called the Queensboro Bridge, but in March 2011, the bridge was officially renamed in honor of former New York City mayor Ed Koch.

The Queensboro Bridge is the northernmost of four toll-free vehicular bridges connecting Manhattan Island to Long Island, along with the Williamsburg, Manhattan, and Brooklyn bridges to the south. It is the first entry point into Manhattan in the course of the New York City Marathon and the last exit point out of Manhattan in the Five Boro Bike Tour.

Description 

The Queensboro Bridge is a two-level double cantilever bridge, with separate cantilevered spans over channels on each side of Roosevelt Island joined by a fixed central truss. In all it has five spans, including approaches between the cantilevered sections and each terminus.  Their lengths are as follows:

Manhattan to Roosevelt Island span length (cantilever): 
Roosevelt Island span length: 
Roosevelt Island to Queens span length (cantilever): 
Manhattan approach span 
Queens approach span 
Total length between anchorages: 
Total length including approaches: 

Until it was surpassed by the Quebec Bridge in 1917, the span between Manhattan and Roosevelt Island was the longest cantilever in North America.

Levels
The upper level of the bridge has four lanes of automobile traffic, consisting of two roadways with two lanes in each directions. It provides a view of the bridge's cantilever truss structure and the New York skyline. Although the two upper level roadways both end at Thomson Avenue on the Queens side, they diverge in opposite directions on the Manhattan side. The lanes used by westbound traffic, located on the northern side of the bridge, lead north to 62nd and 63rd Streets. On the other hand, the lanes normally used by eastbound traffic are located on the southern side of the bridge lead south to 57th and 58th Streets.  The roadway to 57th and 58th Streets is used as a westbound high-occupancy vehicle lane during morning rush hours.

The lower level has five vehicular lanes, the inner four for automobile traffic and the southern outer lane for automobile traffic as well, used exclusively for Queens-bound traffic. The North Outer Roadway was converted into a permanent pedestrian walk and bicycle path in September 2000.

Manhattan approach
The Manhattan approach to the bridge is supported on a series of Guastavino tile vaults which formed the elegant ceiling of the former Food Emporium Bridge Market and the restaurant Guastavino's, located under the bridge. Originally, this open air promenade was known as Bridgemarket and was part of Hornbostel's attempt to make the bridge more hospitable in the city. In February 2020, it was announced that Trader Joe's is planning to open a supermarket in this space, which opened in December 2021.

History

Construction 

Serious proposals for a bridge linking Manhattan to Long Island City were first made as early as 1838, and attempts to finance such a bridge were made by a private company beginning in 1867. Its efforts never came to fruition and the company went bankrupt in the 1890s. Successful plans finally came about in 1903 – after the creation in 1898 of Greater New York City through the amalgamation of Manhattan (New York City), Brooklyn, Queens, the Bronx and Staten Island – under the new city's Department of Bridges, led by Gustav Lindenthal, who was appointed to the new position of Commissioner of Bridges in 1902, in collaboration with Leffert L. Buck and Henry Hornbostel, designers of the Williamsburg Bridge.

Construction soon began, but it would take until 1909 for the bridge to be completed due to delays from the collapse of an incomplete span during a windstorm, and from labor unrest, which included an attempt to dynamite one span. The bridge opened for public use on March 30, 1909, having cost about $18 million and 50 lives. There was a ten-cent toll to drive over the bridge. The bridge's ceremonial grand opening was held on June 12, 1909. At the time, it was the fourth longest bridge in the world. The grand opening included a fireworks display. The bridge was then known as the Blackwell's Island Bridge, from an earlier name for Roosevelt Island.

Early days

The bridge's upper level originally contained two pedestrian walkways and two elevated railway tracks (which connected a spur of the IRT Second Avenue Elevated Line in Manhattan to the Queensboro Plaza station in Queens). Three lanes of roadway were installed on the south side of the upper level in 1931, replacing the former upper-level walkway. All service on the Second Avenue Elevated was discontinued in 1942. From 1955 to 1958, two additional lanes were built on the upper level. The upper-level ramps on the Queens end of the bridge were built during the same time.

The lower deck originally hosted four motor traffic lanes, and what is now the "outer roadway" and pedestrian walk were two trolley lanes. A trolley connected passengers from Queens and Manhattan to a stop in the middle of the bridge, where passengers could take an elevator or the stairs down to Roosevelt Island. The trolley operated from the bridge's opening until April 7, 1957. The trolley lanes and mid-bridge station, as well as the stairs, were removed in the 1950s following the trolley's discontinuation, and for the next few decades the bridge carried 11 lanes of automobile traffic.

In 1919, an elevator building called the elevator storehouse was built adjacent to the bridge on the north side located about where the current tram station is to transport cars and passengers to what was then called Welfare Island, now Roosevelt Island. It was known as the "upside-down" building because its main entrance was on the 10th floor, the height of the bridge deck. This provided access to the hospitals on the island.  This building has now been demolished. Then, in 1955, the Welfare Island Bridge from Queens opened, allowing automobile and truck access to the island and the only non-aquatic means in and out of the island; the vehicular elevator to Queensboro Bridge then closed. As late as August 1973, a separate passenger elevator ran during the work week from near the Queens end of the bridge to Welfare Island via the Welfare Island Elevator Storehouse, which was described at the time as "clean but gloomy".

The bridge was repainted over a seven-month period starting in November 1966. The $240,000 project was the bridge's first repainting in 14 years. The city government considered implementing tolls on the four free East River bridges, including the Queensboro, in 1971. On November 23, 1973, the New York City Landmarks Preservation Commission (LPC) designated the Queensboro Bridge as a city landmark, preventing the bridge from being modified without LPC approval. It was the second East River bridge to be so designated, after the Brooklyn Bridge. While there were concerns that the landmark status could prevent tollbooths from being installed, planners said the landmark designation did not affect the proposal, as tollbooths could just be installed on the bridge's approaches.

Since the 1980s 
In February 1987, the New York City Department of Transportation announced that parts of the northern upper roadway would be closed for two years as part of a $42 million project. The southern upper roadway had just been completed at a cost of $31 million. The northern roadway was closed for one year, reopening in October 1988.

Starting in 1994, two lanes were reserved during rush hours for carpool traffic. For a brief period in 1997, the traffic directions of the upper-level roadways were reversed during rush hours so that the upper level used a left-hand traffic pattern. Manhattan-bound traffic used the southern roadway while Queens-bound traffic used the northern roadway. After residents of the Upper East Side voiced concerns about severe rush-hour congestion, this traffic pattern was discontinued, and the south-side walkway on the lower level was converted to a Queens-bound vehicular lane during the evening rush hour. The outer roadway was later opened to vehicles at all times, but after a series of fatal crashes in 2013, officials decided to close the ramp during the nighttime.

In March 2009, the New York City Bridge Centennial Commission sponsored events marking the centennial of the bridge's opening. The bridge was also designated as a National Historic Civil Engineering Landmark by the American Society of Civil Engineers during the year of its centennial anniversary.

2010: Renaming in honor of Ed Koch
On December 8, 2010, Mayor Bloomberg announced that the bridge would be renamed in honor of former Mayor Ed Koch from the Queensboro Bridge to the Ed Koch Queensboro Bridge. The announcement was made the same week the New York State Legislature voted to rename the Brooklyn Battery Tunnel in honor of former Governor Hugh Carey. The new name became official in March 2011. The renaming decision was unpopular among Queens residents and business leaders, and many local residents continue to refer to the bridge by its older name. New York City Council member Peter Vallone Jr. from Queens vowed to remove Koch's name from the bridge. Vallone said, "Never in a million years would they think to rename the Brooklyn or Manhattan bridges, but for some reason, it was OK to slap Queens around."

In January 2021, the city decided to install a two-way protected bike path on the northern outer roadway of the lower level, to be completed by 2022. The southern outer roadway, which at the time was used by vehicular traffic, would be used exclusively by pedestrians. However, the conversion of the southern outer roadway was subsequently delayed because of a planned renovation of the upper deck. The renovation commenced in February 2022 and was expected to last until December 2023.

Public transportation

Rail tracks 

In addition to the two elevated railway tracks, the bridge also had four streetcar tracks. The following Queens lines operated over the bridge:

 Queensboro Bridge Local, 1909–1957 (last streetcar line in the city)
 Astoria Line (Queens surface), 1910–1939
 Steinway Line, 1910–1939
 College Point Line, 1910–1925
 Corona Line (surface), 1910–1922
 Queens Boulevard Line (surface), 1913–1937

One Manhattan line operated over the bridge, the Third Avenue Railway's 42nd Street Crosstown Line from 1910 to 1950.

Buses 
The bridge carries the Q32 local bus route operated by MTA New York City Transit and the Q60 and Q101 local bus routes operated by the MTA Bus Company. The bridge also carries 20 express bus routes in the eastbound direction only: the MTA Bus Company's , and New York City Transit's X63, X64, and X68. (These bus routes use the Queens-Midtown Tunnel for westbound travel.)

In popular culture 

Literature
 In F. Scott Fitzgerald's 1925 novel The Great Gatsby, Jay Gatsby and Nick Carraway traverse the bridge on their way from Long Island to Manhattan. "The city seen from the Queensboro Bridge," Nick says, "is always the city seen for the first time, in its first wild promise of all the mystery and the beauty in the world".
 In E.B. White's 1952 novel Charlotte's Web, Charlotte tells Wilbur that the bridge took eight years to build, while she could have built a web in a night.
 In the climax of Truman Capote's 2005 novel Summer Crossing, the main character commits suicide and murders three passengers by crashing her car into the Queensboro Bridge.
 In the climax of Norm Macdonald's 2016 book Based on a True Story, Adam Eget is found making a living underneath the Queensboro Bridge, jerking off punks for fifteen dollars a man.

Music
 The title of the Simon & Garfunkel 1966 song "The 59th Street Bridge Song (Feelin' Groovy)" refers to the Queensboro Bridge.  Harpers Bizarre covered the song in 1967, with the record rising to No. 13 on the US Billboard Hot 100 chart, making it the musical group's best-selling hit.
 The Australian group, The Seekers, covered the Simon classic on their 1967 album, Seekers Seen in Green.
 It is also cited in the Jack's Mannequin song "Diane, the Skyscraper," on the Dear Jack EP.
 It is also mentioned by rapper and Queensbridge native MC Shan in his song "The Bridge".
 It is the title of a track from the album Indiana by singer-songwriter David Mead.

Music videos
 Billy Joel's video for his 1985 single "You're Only Human (Second Wind)" was primarily filmed on the bridge.
 Pink Floyd's original video for "Us and Them" prominently features footage of the bridge.
 The Queensbridge hip hop group Mobb Deep filmed the music video for "Shook Ones (Part II)" on the bridge.

Film
 In the 1932 Paramount Pictures light comedy film No Man of Her Own, starring Clark Gable and Carole Lombard, Lombard's character looks out of her hotel window to a view across the East River and the Queensboro Bridge, and refers to "Blackwell's Island", now known as Roosevelt Island.
 In the 1935 Movie After Office Hours Clark Gable and Constance Bennett star in "After Office Hours," a 1935 film directed by Robert Z. Leonard. Gable is Jim Branch, the go-getter editor of a newspaper, who is hot on the trial of a society love triangle.
 In the 1936 screwball comedy My Man Godfrey, the bridge is seen several times as the location of the city dump where the "forgotten men" live.
 In the 1948 film Sorry, Wrong Number, Leona Stevenson (Barbara Stanwyck) is an invalid.  Through her open bedroom window we see the bridge with frequent trains crossing, and on the telephone she overhears a murder plot in which the killer tells someone that he will wait till the train is crossing the bridge "in case her window is open and she should scream."
 In the 1958 Warner Brothers' film Auntie Mame, the bridge serves as a backdrop for Mame Dennis' Beekman Place apartment. 
 The bridge appears prominently in several scenes of the 1966 comedy film Any Wednesday, which starred Jane Fonda, Jason Robards, and Dean Jones.
 In Woody Allen's 1979 film Manhattan, the characters played by Allen and Diane Keaton relax on a bench in front of the bridge at dawn. The shot became the film's poster image.
 The final chase in the 1981 film Escape From New York takes place on the bridge. It is previously named by the President's kidnappers in a ransom note left in his briefcase in Central Park as where they'll release the President if their terms are met and by Issac Hayes's "Duke of New York" as what they'll cross the next day on their way to freedom with the kidnapped president leading them from the hood of the "duke"'s car..
 The climax of the 1985 film Turk 182! takes place on and around the Queensboro Bridge.
 The bridge is seen in the opening credits scene of the 1985 film Death Wish 3.
 In the 1991 film New Jack City, Nino Brown and the Duh Duh Man hang a man over the side of the bridge because of a drug debt he owes. Eventually they throw him off it to his death.
 In the 1992 family comedy film Home Alone 2: Lost in New York, the protagonist Kevin is seen taking a taxi over the bridge upon his entrance into New York City.
 In the 1993 romantic comedy film For Love or Money, the main protagonists Doug Ireland (Michael J. Fox) and Andy Hart (Gabrielle Anwar) reunite on opposite sides of the Queensboro Bridge and call out to each other on what they found out about unscrupulous billionaire Christian Hanover (Anthony Higgins). 
 In the 1997 American action thriller film Conspiracy Theory, directed by Richard Donner, the bridge is crossed many times throughout the film.
 In the 2002 superhero film Spider-Man, the climax of the film where Spider-Man battles against his archenemy, the Green Goblin takes place around the bridge.
 In the 2003 slapstick comedy film Anger Management, Dave Buznik (Adam Sandler) and Dr. Buddy Rydell (played by Jack Nicholson), stop their car in the middle of the bridge to sing "I Feel Pretty".
 In the 2003 American comedy film Elf, when Buddy is ostracized by his father, he goes to the Queensboro Bridge to brood. It is from there that he sees Santa's sleigh out of control, on its way to Central Park.
 The 2010 movie Salt has a scene that takes place on, and was filmed on, the Queensboro Bridge.
 The Queensboro Bridge was featured in 2012 as one of the few remaining bridges in The Dark Knight Rises after Bane has taken control of the city.
 In the 2013 movie Now You See Me, a car chase across the bridge leads to a crash in which the death of a character is faked.
 The bridge was featured in the 2014 film A Most Violent Year, in which there is an attempted hijacking of a fuel truck on it, followed by a short shootout and foot chase that leads down one of the bridge's service staircases. The bridge is referred to as the "59th Street Bridge" in the film.
 In the 2018 film Avengers: Infinity War, Peter Parker is on a school bus driving over the Queensboro Bridge. When he sees an alien spaceship over Manhattan, he changes into Spider-Man and exits the bus, swinging towards the spaceship.

Television
 The Queensboro Bridge has been shown in the credits of the television series Archie Bunker's Place, The King of Queens,  Rescue Me and Alphas. In addition, the opening sequence of Taxi depicts a Checker Taxi cab driving out of Manhattan on the upper deck of the bridge, and George and Louise Jefferson are shown riding in a taxi on the bridge's lower deck in the opening sequence of The Jeffersons.
 It is referred to in the opening theme of The King of Queens, in the line "...sitting here in traffic, on the Queensboro Bridge tonight."
 The bridge is taken over by a small army of Trolls in "Troll Bridge", the fifth episode of the first season of The Real Ghostbusters.
 The bridge is also referred to in The Simpsons 1996 episode "You Only Move Twice", when Hank Scorpio destroys it to show that he's not bluffing (though there is a possibility that the bridge collapsed on its own).
 An illustration of the bridge by Aurore Giscard d'Estaing is used in the main title of the A&E TV series A Nero Wolfe Mystery.

Video games
 The bridge was destroyed in the video game Crysis 2 when a facility on Roosevelt Island exploded, causing the bridge to violently collapse.
 The bridge appears in the game Driver: Parallel Lines and is able to be traveled on foot or by car. During the mission "Kidnap" the player must blow up a billboard on the Manhattan side to block traffic.
 The bridge is part of the Nintendo DS game C.O.P.: The Recruit.
 The bridge appears in The Crew and The Crew 2.
  Joey refers to the bridge just having been finished when he was a kid in "Blackwell Unbound"

See also 
 List of bridges documented by the Historic American Engineering Record in New York

References 
Notes

Bibliography
"Abandoned Stations: Queensborough Bridge Railway Terminal"

External links 

NYC DOT.gov
NYCroads.com
"Queensboro Bridge" on Transportation Alternatives
Dave's Electric Railroads Thirty-three historic photographs of the Queensborough Bridge Railway trolley cars

1908 establishments in New York City
Bike paths in New York City
Bridges completed in 1909
Bridges in Manhattan
Bridges in Queens, New York
Bridges on the National Register of Historic Places in New York City
Bridges over the East River
Buildings and structures on the National Register of Historic Places in Manhattan
Cantilever bridges in the United States
Double-decker bridges
Henry Hornbostel buildings
Historic American Engineering Record in New York City
Historic Civil Engineering Landmarks
Long Island City
National Register of Historic Places in Queens, New York
New York City Designated Landmarks in Manhattan
New York City Designated Landmarks in Queens, New York
Pedestrian bridges in New York City
Railroad bridges in New York City
Railroad bridges on the National Register of Historic Places in New York City
Road bridges in New York City
Road bridges on the National Register of Historic Places in New York City
Roads with a reversible lane
Roosevelt Island
Steel bridges in the United States